Chell is the silent protagonist in the Portal video game series developed by Valve. She appears in both Portal and Portal 2 as the main player character and as a supporting character in some other video games. Not much is known about Chell but some posit she is the daughter of an employee at Aperture Science Laboratories, the main setting of the games.

Chell's face- and body-model were derived from those of Alésia Glidewell. She experienced a redesign in Portal 2 which was often changed during development. For example, the original redesign featured a laboratory-hat. A character presented in first-person perspective, Chell can only be seen through reflections and portals in the game.

Chell was generally well-received by critics and gamers, with many people praising the fact that she does not speak and looks like a "normal-looking and normal-dressing woman" in contrast to many other female characters in first-person shooters.

Development and design
Valve's Erik Wolpaw felt that it did not really matter what kind of person Chell was, noting that playtesters of the first Portal often did not know her name as it was never mentioned. Wolpaw explained that they never mentioned her name as  felt like they had this relationship with GLaDOS, and they wanted GLaDOS to recognize them". Chet Faliszek noted that Chell was the female version of Gordon Freeman's role as a silent protagonist (in the Half-Life video games). Wolpaw explained it served the game's humour better if she did not talk, and that if the "straight man in a world gone mad" did talk, referring to Chell, "it would suck". In fact, there is one part of the first game where GLaDOS seems to get annoyed by Chell's refusal to respond to her, saying, "Are you even listening to me?" (Wolpaw has commented a few times that Chell simply won't give GLaDOS the satisfaction of a response, but he doesn't intend that theory to be taken seriously). In an interview by IGN about Portal 2: Lab Rat, Valve's Michael Avon Oeming commented that, currently, "Chell is more of a storytelling device," comparing her to the Spirit character by Will Eisner, but noted that more may be seen of Chell in the future.

Chell's face and body model were derived from those of the director, producer and voice actress Alésia Glidewell. When making Portal 2, developers considered not bringing back the character. However, this was changed as playtesters wanted GLaDOS to recognize them as the person who had killed her in the first game. In her original redesign for Portal 2 developers tried to make her look appealing, yet not overdesigned, with nothing made simply for fashion. They explored changing her nationality, and tried to make her look less human due to the "constant dehumanization of these test subjects". Being a test subject, Chell's suit was designed to look neither sexy nor unattractive. The original redesign of the character featured a laboratory hat, which was thought of halfway through the concepting phase. Matt Charlesworth, Valve's concept artist, commented that the hat reminded him of test pilots.

This look was eventually abandoned in favor of returning to her original orange jumpsuit, this time with the jumpsuit wrapped around her waist. Valve's art team explained that this was to give her more freedom and help her stand out more as an individual.

Appearances

In Portal, Chell is performing tests for Aperture Science, which are being overseen by GLaDOS, an artificially intelligent computer system. Chell destroys GLaDOS in her efforts to escape but is wounded, and an unseen figure called the Party Escort Bot drags her back inside.

In Portal 2: Lab Rat, a tie-in comic for Portal 2, Chell is put in stasis by Doug Rattmann after the events of Portal. He is revealed to be responsible for Chell taking part in the tests. Chell reappears in Portal 2 where she is reawakened by Wheatley. She and Wheatley attempt to escape the laboratory, and in the process accidentally reanimate GLaDOS. GLaDOS, furious with Chell for having "murdered" her, forces her to do more tests until Wheatley helps her escape. Chell and Wheatley team up to destroy GLaDOS's neurotoxin and turret production. GLaDOS eventually recaptures Chell, but fails to kill her due to her lack of neurotoxin and turrets. Chell takes advantage of the moment to replace GLaDOS's core with Wheatley's core. Wheatley, corrupted and driven to megalomania by inhabiting GLaDOS's former shell, betrays Chell and instead of freeing her, sends her to the very bottom of the Testing Facility. There she navigates several Mobility Gel testing areas that were in use between 1956 and 1985. As she ascends through level after level, she learns about the late founder of Aperture Science, Cave Johnson, and his assistant, Caroline, whose personality and intelligence were ultimately implanted in GLaDOS. Chell finds and picks up GLaDOS, whom Wheatley has placed in a small module powered by a potato battery. Opening the hatch that seals off the old facility from the new, Chell inadvertently pumps Mobility Gels up to the new facility, which later proves useful. Wheatley captures her and forces her to run tests for him until she finds his lair. And after attaching corrupted cores onto Wheatley, with the process of reverting being booby-trapped, she fires a portal to the moon which sucks her and Wheatley out into space. Chell is saved by GLaDOS, who lets her leave the facility via an elevator that takes her to the surface.

Chell's origin is unclear; GLaDOS claims that in Chell's file it states that she is adopted. In Portal 2, a long-abandoned science fair poster that was part of "Bring Your Daughter to Work Day" — the same day GLaDOS went rogue — is attributed to "Chell", implying that at least one of her parents worked for Aperture Science. Some posit that Chell is the daughter of Cave Johnson, the founder and CEO of Aperture Science.

As both Portal games are presented in a first-person view, Chell is only seen fleetingly in normal gameplay, usually when portals are aligned in such a way that the player is able to create a recursive view of Chell. Placing two portals next to each other on a wall and then partially entering the one portal while facing the other allows the player a close-up view of Chell's face.

Chell is a playable character in the crossover game Lego Dimensions, and has access to her portal gun. Her character pack includes a sentry turret and a Companion Cube, and unlocks a bonus level in which she returns to Aperture and is reunited with Wheatley, with the two trying to stop GLaDOS once more.

A Portal-themed costume featuring Chell holding a portal gun is available for the 2020 battle royale game Fall Guys: Ultimate Knockout.

Reception and analysis

GamesRadar's Joe McNeilly called Chell an example of Portal deconstructing first-person shooter archetypes, noting that she was neither in third-person nor sexualized unlike most female characters in first-person shooters. GamesRadar called Chell the antidote to the half-naked woman cliché, praising her for not being sexualized and being fully clothed, commenting, "The hero of Portal just happens to be a normal-looking and normal-dressing woman, like 50% of the world's population." GamesRadar listed Chell (jokingly) as one of its Mediocre Game Babes, calling her jumpsuit repulsive and saying, "[Her] heel springs make her look like one of those aliens from The Arrival." IGN listed Chell as the sixth top gaming heroine, calling her "one of the most resourceful heroines on [their] list". In an in-depth analysis of Portal, Daniel Johnson from Gamasutra said that Chell being female, as well as GLaDOS's line about testing your daughter in Aperture Science Bring Your Daughter to Work Day, alluded to the testing of women. Johnson also noted that the information about who Chell is and why she is there reinforced the position of the player as an unwilling participant. GamesRadar said that it considered putting Chell on its list of the Top 7 Tasteful game heroines, but said she lost out to Zoey from Left 4 Dead.

Kotaku's Luke Plunkett called Chell's original design in the first game memorable, later noting how in the first Portal "Chell [...] was never really the star of the game" as well as how little she was actually seen. Mike Fahey, also from Kotaku, defended Chell from people saying that she should talk, and said, "The last thing I would want in Portal 2 is for Chell to speak". When reviewing Portal 2, Game Informer's Adam Biessener said that much of what makes Portal and Portal 2 so special was the execution and the originality of standing in Chell's shoes and experiencing her destiny.

References

Adoptee characters in video games
Cryonically preserved characters in video games
Female characters in video games
Fictional characters with neurotrauma
Fictional slaves in video games
Orphan characters in video games
Portal characters
Silent protagonists
Video game characters introduced in 2007
Video game protagonists